Kosmos 277 ( meaning Cosmos 277), known before launch as DS-P1-Yu No.20, was a Soviet satellite which was used as a radar calibration target for tests of anti-ballistic missiles. It was a  spacecraft, which was built by the Yuzhnoye Design Bureau, and launched in 1969 as part of the Dnepropetrovsk Sputnik programme.

Launch 
Kosmos 277 was launched from Site 133/1 at the Plesetsk Cosmodrome, atop a Kosmos-2I 63SM carrier rocket. The launch occurred on 4 April 1969 at 13:00:04 UTC, and resulted in Kosmos 277's successful deployment into low Earth orbit. Upon reaching orbit, it was assigned its Kosmos designation, and received the International Designator 1969-033A.

It remained in orbit until it decayed and reentered the atmosphere on 6 July 1969. It was the twentieth of seventy nine DS-P1-Yu satellites to be launched, and the nineteenth of seventy two to successfully reach orbit.

See also

1969 in spaceflight

References

Spacecraft launched in 1969
Kosmos satellites
Dnepropetrovsk Sputnik program